Ağlan is a village in the Osmaneli District, Bilecik Province, Turkey. Its population is 222 (2021).

References

Villages in Osmaneli District